Jason Winfree (born March 22, 1973), professionally known by his stage name Haystak is an American rapper from Nashville, Tennessee

Early life
Jason Winfree was born to teenage parents in Trenton, Tennessee, outside of Nashville and was raised by his grandparents. At the age of 15, he was arrested and convicted for bringing Valium and cocaine to school. He served two years and, when he was released, began a music career. He rapped about his life as so-called "white trash", exploring the social dimensions of being white and underprivileged in the South.

Career
In the late 1990s, he signed with a local rap label, Street Flavor, and began a business relationship with producers Kevin Grisham and Sonny Paradise. The partnership resulted in Mak Million, Haystak's 1998 debut album, followed two years later by Car Fulla White Boys. By this point, Haystak had garnered a substantial regional following, and underground hardcore rap publication Murder Dog began promoting his work. The attention attracted the label Koch Records who signed Haystak and re-released Car Fulla White Boys in late summer 2000. Two years later, Koch released Haystak's third album, The Natural.

Haystak released his latest solo album entitled Easy 2 Hate on November 30, 2010 through Haystak, Inc.

Haystak is divorced and has two children. In addition to rap music, he has been featured on film Hustle & Flow where he played the DJ named Mickey.

Haystak collaborated with fellow Nashville native JellyRoll on the albums Strictly Business in 2011 and its sequel Business As Usual in 2013.  

In June 2018, Statik G signed Haystak to his record label RhymeSick for a 5 year deal and immediately booked several national tours for the rest of the year into 2019.

Legal issues
In 2006, Haystak was charged and convicted of sexual assault. He was sentenced to 11 months and 29 days of supervised probation. In May 2014, he was arrested on domestic violence charges. In December, he was arrested for intent to commit sexual abuse during a concert in Iowa, and the jury found him not guilty after reviewing video footage from the concert. The accuser, who is also an independent artist, has since admitted Haystak was innocent and performed on stage with him in 2019 in Nebraska.

Discography

Studio albums

References

External links

1973 births
Living people
Rappers from Tennessee
21st-century American rappers
People from Lebanon, Tennessee